Anna of Isenburg-Büdingen (1460 – 27 July 1522 in Babenhausen) was a German noblewoman.  She was a daughter of Count Louis II of Isenburg-Büdingen and Countess Maria of Nassau-Wiesbaden-Idstein.

Life 
She married Philipp II, Count of Hanau-Lichtenberg on 9 September 1480.  She needed a papal dispensation for her marriage, because she was a fourth degree relative of Philip.  She brought a dowry of 4500 guilders into the marriage.  She received a dower of 1000 guilders and a jointure of 450 guilders annually from the revenue of Schaafheim Castle.  They both renounced their claims on the Lordship of Büdingen.

Anna died on 27 July 1522 and was buried in the St. Nicholas church in Babenhausen, in front of the altar.

Issue 
Anna and Philip had the following children together:
 Philip III (18 October 1482 – 15 May 1538).
 Anna (1485 – 11 October 1559), a nun in the Marienborn Abbey
 Margaret (1486 – 6 August 1560 in Babenhausen), also nun in the Marienborn Abbey, interned for life at Babenhausen Castle, because of a "slip". She was buried in the St. Nicholas church in Babenhausen.
 Ludwig (5 October 1487 in Buchsweiler – 3 December 1553 in Willstätt; buried in the St. Adelphi church in Neuweiler), unmarried clergyman
 Maria (– probably 1526), abbess of Klarenthal Abbey from 1512 to 1525
 Amalia (7 June 1490 in Buchsweiler – 11 March 1552 in Pfaffenhoffen; buried in the St. Adelphi church in Neuweiler), a nun
 Reinhard (19 February 1494 in Klingenberg am Main – 7 June 1490 in Buchsweiler; buried in the St. Adelphi in Neuweiler), joined the clergy

References 
 J. G. Lehmann: Urkundliche Geschichte der Grafschaft Hanau-Lichtenberg im unteren Elsasse, 2 vols, 1862, reprinted: Pirmasens 1970
 Sebastian Scholz: Die Inschriften der Stadt Darmstadt und des Landkreises Darmstadt-Dieburg und Groß-Gerau, in the series Die deutschen Inschriften vol. 49, Mainzer series, vol. 6, ed. by Akademie der Wissenschaften Mainz, Wiesbaden 1999
 Reinhard Suchier: Genealogie des Hanauer Grafenhausen, in: Festschrift des Hanauer Geschichtsvereins zu seiner fünfzigjährigen Jubelfeier am 27. August 1894, Hanau, 1894
 Ernst J. Zimmermann, Hanau Stadt und Land, 3rd ed., Hanau, 1919, reprinted 1978

Footnotes 

House of Hanau
House of Isenburg
1460 births
1522 deaths
15th-century German women
15th-century German people
16th-century German people